Figarden (formerly, Bullard and Fig Garden) is an unincorporated community in Fresno County, California.

A post office operated at Figarden from 1925 to 1944, moving in 1939, and from 1947 to 1951.

References

Unincorporated communities in California
Unincorporated communities in Fresno County, California